Michel Modo (born Michel Henri Louis Goi; 30 March 1937 - 25 September 2008) was a French actor and humorist. Modo died of cancer on 25 September 2008 in Vaires-sur-Marne (Seine-et-Marne).

Career
He is best known in France for having formed in the late 1950s a comedy duo, Grosso et Modo, with actor Guy Grosso. The duo appeared in many movies with Louis de Funès, among which the series of Gendarmes de Saint Tropez, where he will played the role of Constable Berlicot alongside Michel Galabru, Jean Lefebvre and Christian Marin. They were also Laflûte and Quince in The Dream of a Summer Night by Jean-Christophe Averty.

Between 1993 and 1997 he is one of the recurring actors in the television series Highlander as Maurice Lolande, humorous character characterizing the average French person.

In December 2005, he stars in the television series Plus belle la vie alongside Colette Renard. He plays a bum philosopher disguised as Santa Claus.

He also dubbed several recurring characters in the French version of the animated series The Simpsons. At his sudden death in 2008 at the age of 71, when dubbing the last episodes of season 19, he was replaced on the spot by Gérard Rinaldi, who died in his turn from cancer on March 2, 2012.

Filmography

La Belle Américaine (1961) as Slovak
 All the Gold in the World  (1961) as Tony
Carom Shots (1963) as Le facteur (uncredited)
Kriss Romani (1963) as Le garde de Pilate (uncredited)
Bebert and the Train (1963) as Un gendarme 
Le Gendarme de Saint-Tropez (1964) as Maréchal des Logis Berlicot
Les gorilles (1964) as Un agent cycliste
The Sucker (1965) as Un douanier
La tête du client (1965) as Le collègue de François-Joseph
Killer Spy (1965) as L'agent à la bicyclette qui verbalise #2
The Gendarme in New York (1965) as Maréchal des Logis Berlicot
What's Cooking in Paris (1966) as Petit Roger, un serveur
Don't Look Now, We're Being Shot At (1966) as cross-eyed German soldier
Un homme de trop (1967) as Le juif torturé
La feldmarescialla (1967) as Fritz, Vogel's Assistant
The Gendarme Gets Married (1968) as Maréchal des Logis Berlicot
The Gendarme Takes Off (1970) as Maréchal des Logis Berlicot
Cry of the Cormoran (1970) as  Le policier
The Edifying and Joyous Story of Colinot (1973) as Le frère Robichon
Operation Lady Marlene (1975) as Sansonnet
 (1975) as Le soldat 'groupir'
The Smurfs and the Magic Flute (1976) as Peewit (voice)
Ne me touchez pas... (1977) as Albert
Le mille-pattes fait des claquettes (1977) as Le gendarme
Les Bidasses au pensionnat (1978) as Sergeant Michaud
Liebesgrüße aus der Lederhose, 5. Teil: Die Bruchpiloten vom Königssee (1978) as Konrad Zillich
Le gendarme et les extra-terrestres (1979) as Maréchal des Logis Berlicot
 (1979) as Le clerc de notaire
Les fabuleuses aventures du légendaire Baron de Munchausen (1979) (voice)
L'avare (1980) as La merluche
Pétrole! Pétrole! (1981) as Alain Terrieur
Le jour se lève et les conneries commencent (1981) as Norbert
 (1981) as Sergent Merlin
 (1981) as Le vendeur du sex-shop
Le gendarme et les gendarmettes (1982) as Maréchal des Logis Berlicot
Le braconnier de Dieu (1983) as The president of the polling station
Les Planqués du régiment (1983) as Adjudant Badubec
L'Exécutrice (1986) as  Le commissaire
The Big Bang (1987) as Conseillé (voice)
My Father's Glory (1990) as le facteur
My Mother's Castle (1990) as Le facteur
Pétain (1993) as Pucheu
Bimboland (1998) as Aristide Roumestan
Poltergay (2006) as Henri 'Nanny' Bernier - le patron du bar

External links

1937 births
2008 deaths
Deaths from cancer in France
French humorists
French male television actors
French male voice actors
French male writers
People from Carpentras
20th-century French male writers